This is a list of heroes of the Christian Church in the Anglican Communion which designates persons who are celebrated by the Anglican Communion as having lived a life of piety that were not canonized, as well as canonized saints with a practice similar to the Roman Catholic Church and Eastern Orthodox Church. The Anglican Communion is an international association of national and regional Anglican churches (and a few other episcopal churches) in full communion with the Church of England (which is regarded as the mother church of the worldwide communion) and specifically with its principal primate, the Archbishop of Canterbury.

Heroes
 Jesus
 Alcuin
 Alfred the Great
 Lancelot Andrewes
 Bishop Henry
 Mary Brant
 Thomas Bray
 William Grant Broughton
 John Bunyan
 Joseph Butler
 Josephine Butler
 Caroline Chisholm
 John Donne
 Nick Enderby
 Nicholas Ferrar
 George Fox
 Charles Gore
 Robert Grosseteste
 Reginald Heber
 George Herbert
 Walter Hilton
 Richard Hooker
 John Horden
 Charles Inglis
 Ini Kopuria
 John Keble
 Thomas Ken
 Geoffrey Anketell Studdert Kennedy
 Edward King (English bishop)
 Lanfranc
 Stephen Langton
 Hugh Latimer
 William Laud
 William Law
 Li Tim-Oi
 Janani Luwum
 Robert Machray
 Frederick Maurice
 Bernard Mizeki
 John Mason Neale
 John Henry Newman
 John Newton
 Florence Nightingale
 William of Ockham
 Pandita Ramabai
 Edmund Peck
 Edward Bouverie Pusey
 Nicholas Ridley (martyr)
 Richard Rolle
 Christina Rossetti
 Samuel Seabury
 George Augustus Selwyn
 Charles Simeon
 Mary Slessor
 Jeremy Taylor
 William Temple (archbishop)
 William Tyndale
 Evelyn Underhill
 Isaac Watts
 Charles Wesley
 John Wesley
 William Wilberforce
 John Wycliffe

See also
:Category:Anglican saints

Anglicanism